Belmont High School is 1 of 6 high schools in the Dayton Public Schools school district. The school is located in Dayton, Ohio, and serves approximately 1000 students. The school mascot is the bison. Belmont High School did not meet any of the 13 indicators for the 2016–2017 school year on the State of Ohio Dept. of Education Report Card, and therefore received an 'F' grade. In addition, the school received a 38.9% score with a grade of 'F' on the Performance Index section of the Report Card as well. The school opened on September 10, 1956 for students in 8th through 11th grades.

The Belmont High School football team competes in the American Division of the Southwest Ohio Public League. All other athletic teams compete in the Dayton City League.

Notable alumni

 Martin Bayless, Former NFL player 
 Bill Hosket Jr., former professional basketball player 
 Don May, former professional basketball player
 Chuck McKibben, voice actor, broadcast producer/director, voice-over coach, and audiobook reader
 Bud Olsen, former professional basketball player
 Mike Turner, Congressman
 Harold Leighton Weller, conductor and music educator

Ohio High School Athletic Association State Championships
 Boys Basketball – 1964

References

High schools in Dayton, Ohio
Public high schools in Ohio
1959 establishments in Ohio